The 56th Annual Grammy Awards presentation was held on January 26, 2014, at Staples Center in Los Angeles. The show was broadcast on CBS at 8 p.m. ET/PT and was hosted for the third time by LL Cool J. The show was moved to January to avoid competing with the 2014 Winter Olympics in Sochi, as was the case in 2010.

The eligibility period for the 56th Annual Grammy Awards was October 1, 2012, to September 30, 2013. The nominations were announced on December 6, 2013 during a live televised concert on CBS, The Grammy Nominations Concert Live – Countdown to Music's Biggest Night. Jay-Z received the most nominations with nine. Justin Timberlake, Kendrick Lamar, Macklemore & Ryan Lewis and Pharrell Williams each received seven nominations. Daft Punk and Pharrell Williams were nominated twice for both Album of the Year and Record of the Year. Sound engineer Bob Ludwig received the most nominations by a non-performing artist, with five.

Daft Punk won four awards, including Album of the Year for Random Access Memories and Record of the Year, with Pharrell Williams, for "Get Lucky", and an additional win for Best Engineered Album, Non-Classical completing a clean sweep for the project that night.
Macklemore & Ryan Lewis won four trophies, including Best New Artist, and led an industry show of support for gay marriage with a performance of their song "Same Love" to accompany a mass wedding of gay and heterosexual couples, which was presided over by Queen Latifah. Lorde's "Royals" received awards for Best Pop Solo Performance and Song of the Year. Carole King was honored as MusiCares Person of the Year on January 24, two days prior to the awards ceremony.

On June 4, 2013, the Recording Academy approved a number of changes recommended by its Awards & Nominations Committee, including adding a new category for Best American Roots Song to the American Music field. This songwriters' award will encompass all the subgenres in this field such as Americana, bluegrass, blues, folk, and regional roots music. The Best Hard Rock/Metal Performance category was renamed Best Metal Performance and became a stand-alone category. Hard rock performances will now be screened in the Best Rock Performance category. The Music Video field will become the Best Music Video/Film field. Its two categories will be renamed: Best Short Form Music Video will now be known as Best Music Video and Best Long Form Music Video will change into Best Music Film. These changes bring the total number of categories at the 2014 Grammy Awards to 82, up from 81 at the 2013 Grammy Awards.

Performers

Presenters 
Pharrell Williams and Anna Kendrick – presented Best New Artist
Anna Faris and Juanes – presented Best Pop Duo/Group Performance
Steve Coogan – introduced Katy Perry
Bruno Mars – introduced P!nk
Ariana Grande and Miguel – presented Best Pop Solo Performance
Black Sabbath – introduced Paul McCartney and Ringo Starr
Jamie Foxx – presented Best Rap/Sung Collaboration
Julia Roberts – introduced Paul McCartney
Gloria Estefan and Marc Anthony – presented Best Pop Vocal Album
Jeremy Renner – introduced Willie Nelson, Blake Shelton, Merle Haggard and Kris Kristofferson
Zac Brown and Martina McBride – presented Best Country Album
Smokey Robinson and Steven Tyler 
Neil Patrick Harris – introduced Daft Punk
Cyndi Lauper – introduced Sara Bareilles and Carole King
Sara Bareilles and Carole King – presented Song of the Year
Jared Leto – introduced Metallica 
Smokey Robinson and Steven Tyler – presented Record of the Year
Queen Latifah – introduced Macklemore & Ryan Lewis
John Legend and Ryan Seacrest – presented Music Educator Award
Lang Lang – introduced "In Memoriam"
Olivia Harrison, Alicia Keys and Yoko Ono – presented Album of the Year

Winners and nominees
The winners and nominees per category were:

General
Record of the Year
"Get Lucky" – Daft Punk, Pharrell Williams & Nile Rodgers
 Thomas Bangalter & Guy-Manuel de Homem-Christo, producers;
 Peter Franco, Mick Guzauski, Florian Lagatta & Daniel Lerner, engineers/mixers;
 Bob Ludwig & Antoine Chabert, mastering engineers
 "Radioactive" – Imagine Dragons
 Alex Da Kid, producer;
 Manny Marroquin & Josh Mosser, engineers/mixers;
 Joe LaPorta, mastering engineer
 "Royals" – Lorde
 Joel Little, producer;
 Joel Little, engineer/mixer;
 Stuart Hawkes, mastering engineer
 "Locked Out of Heaven" – Bruno Mars
 Jeff Bhasker, Emile Haynie, Mark Ronson & The Smeezingtons, producers;
 Alalal, Josh Blair, Wayne Gordon, Ari Levine, Manny Marroquin & Mark Ronson, engineers/mixers;
 David Kutch, mastering engineer
 "Blurred Lines" – Robin Thicke featuring T.I. and Pharrell Williams
 Pharrell, producer;
 Andrew Coleman & Tony Maserati, engineers/mixers;
 Chris Gehringer, mastering engineer

Album of the Year
Random Access Memories – Daft Punk
 Julian Casablancas, DJ Falcon, Todd Edwards, Chilly Gonzales, Giorgio Moroder, Panda Bear, Nile Rodgers, Paul Williams & Pharrell Williams, featured artists;
 Thomas Bangalter, Julian Casablancas, Guy-Manuel de Homem-Christo, DJ Falcon & Todd Edwards, producers;
 Peter Franco, Mick Guzauski, Florian Lagatta, Guillaume Le Braz & Daniel Lerner, engineers/mixers;
 Antoine Chabert & Bob Ludwig, mastering engineers
 The Blessed Unrest – Sara Bareilles
 Sara Bareilles, Mark Endert & John O'Mahony, producers;
 Jeremy Darby, Mark Endert & John O'Mahony, engineers/mixers;
 Greg Calbi, mastering engineer
 good kid, m.A.A.d city – Kendrick Lamar
 Mary J. Blige, Dr. Dre, Drake, Jay Rock, Jay-Z, MC Eiht & Anna Wise, featured artists;
 DJ Dahi, Hit-Boy, Skhye Hutch, Just Blaze, Like, Terrace Martin, Dawaun Parker, Pharrell, Rahki, Scoop DeVille, Sounwave, Jack Splash, Tabu, Tha Bizness & T-Minus, producers;
 Derek Ali, Dee Brown, Dr. Dre, James Hunt, Mauricio "Veto" Iragorri, Mike Larson, Jared Scott, Jack Splash & Andrew Wright, engineers/mixers;
 Mike Bozzi & Brian "Big Bass" Gardner, mastering engineers
 Red – Taylor Swift
 Gary Lightbody & Ed Sheeran, featured artists;
 Jeff Bhasker, Nathan Chapman, Dann Huff, Jacknife Lee, Max Martin, Shellback, Taylor Swift, Butch Walker & Dan Wilson, producers;
 Joe Baldridge, Sam Bell, Matt Bishop, Chad Carlson, Nathan Chapman, Serban Ghenea, John Hanes, Sam Holland, Michael Ilbert, Tyler Johnson, Jacknife Lee, Steve Marcantonio, Manny Marroquin, Justin Niebank, John Rausch, Eric Robinson, Pawel Sek, Jake Sinclair, Mark "Spike" Stent & Andy Thompson, engineers/mixers;
 Tom Coyne & Hank Williams, mastering engineers
 The Heist – Macklemore & Ryan Lewis
 Ab-Soul, Ben Bridwell, Ray Dalton, Eighty4 Fly, Hollis, Mary Lambert, Baffalo Madonna, Evan Roman, Schoolboy Q, Allen Stone, The Teaching & Wanz, featured artists;
 Ryan Lewis, producer;
 Ben Haggerty, Ryan Lewis, Amos Miller, Reed Ruddy & Pete Stewart, engineers/mixers;
 Tom Coyne & Brian "Big Bass" Gardner, mastering engineer

Song of the Year
"Royals"
 Ella Yelich O'Connor, Joel Little, songwriters (Lorde)
 "Just Give Me a Reason"
 Pink, Jeff Bhasker and Nate Ruess, songwriters (Pink featuring Nate Ruess)
 "Locked Out of Heaven"
 Bruno Mars, Philip Lawrence, Ari Levine, songwriters (Bruno Mars)
 "Roar"
 Katy Perry, Lukasz Gottwald, Max Martin, Bonnie McKee and Henry Walter, songwriters (Katy Perry)
 "Same Love"
 Ben Haggerty, Ryan Lewis and Mary Lambert, songwriters (Macklemore & Ryan Lewis featuring Mary Lambert)

Best New Artist
Macklemore & Ryan Lewis
 James Blake
 Kendrick Lamar
 Kacey Musgraves
 Ed Sheeran

Pop
Best Pop Solo Performance
"Royals" – Lorde
 "Brave" – Sara Bareilles
 "When I Was Your Man" – Bruno Mars
 "Roar" – Katy Perry
 "Mirrors" – Justin Timberlake

Best Pop Duo/Group Performance
"Get Lucky" – Daft Punk, Pharrell Williams & Nile Rodgers
 "Just Give Me a Reason" – Pink featuring Nate Ruess
 "Stay" – Rihanna & Mikky Ekko
 "Blurred Lines" – Robin Thicke featuring T.I. and Pharrell Williams 
 "Suit & Tie" – Justin Timberlake & Jay-Z

Best Pop Instrumental Album
Steppin' Out – Herb Alpert
 The Beat – Boney James
 HandPicked – Earl Klugh
 Summer Horns – Dave Koz, Gerald Albright, Mindi Abair & Richard Elliot
 Hacienda – Jeff Lorber Fusion

Best Pop Vocal Album
Unorthodox Jukebox – Bruno Mars
 Paradise – Lana Del Rey
 Pure Heroine – Lorde
 Blurred Lines – Robin Thicke
 The 20/20 Experience – The Complete Experience – Justin Timberlake

Dance/Electronica
Best Dance Recording
"Clarity" – Zedd & Foxes
Anton Zaslavski (Zedd), producer and mixer
 "Need U (100%)" – Duke Dumont featuring A*M*E & MNEK
 Adam Dyment & Tommy Forrest, producers; Adam Dyment & Tommy Forrest, mixers
 "Sweet Nothing" – Calvin Harris & Florence Welch
 Calvin Harris, producer; Calvin Harris, mixer
 "Atmosphere" – Kaskade
 Finn Bjarnson & Ryan Raddon, producers; Ryan Raddon, mixer
 "This Is What It Feels Like" – Armin Van Buuren & Trevor Guthrie
 Armin Van Buuren & Benno De Goeij, producers; Armin Van Buuren & Benno De Goeij, mixers

Best Dance/Electronica Album
Random Access Memories – Daft Punk
 Settle – Disclosure
 18 Months – Calvin Harris
 Atmosphere – Kaskade
 A Color Map of the Sun – Pretty Lights

Traditional Pop
Best Traditional Pop Vocal Album
To Be Loved – Michael Bublé
 Viva Duets – Tony Bennett and various artists
 The Standards – Gloria Estefan
 Cee Lo's Magic Moment – Cee Lo Green
 Now – Dionne Warwick

Rock
Best Rock Performance
"Radioactive" – Imagine Dragons
 "Kashmir (Live)" – Led Zeppelin
 "Always Alright" – Alabama Shakes
 "The Stars (Are Out Tonight)" – David Bowie
 "My God Is the Sun" – Queens of the Stone Age
 "I'm Shakin'" – Jack White

Best Metal Performance
"God Is Dead?" – Black Sabbath
 "T.N.T." – Anthrax
 "The Enemy Inside" – Dream Theater
 "In Due Time" – Killswitch Engage
 "Room 24" – Volbeat & King Diamond

Best Rock Song
"Cut Me Some Slack"
 Dave Grohl, Paul McCartney, Krist Novoselic & Pat Smear, songwriters (Paul McCartney, Dave Grohl, Krist Novoselic, Pat Smear)
 "Ain't Messin 'Round"
 Gary Clark, Jr., songwriter (Gary Clark, Jr.)
 "Doom and Gloom"
 Mick Jagger & Keith Richards, songwriters (The Rolling Stones)
 "God Is Dead?"
 Geezer Butler, Tony Iommi & Ozzy Osbourne, songwriters (Black Sabbath)
 "Panic Station"
 Matthew Bellamy, songwriter (Muse)

Best Rock Album
Celebration Day – Led Zeppelin
 13 – Black Sabbath
 The Next Day – David Bowie
 Mechanical Bull – Kings of Leon
 ...Like Clockwork – Queens of the Stone Age
 Psychedelic Pill – Neil Young & Crazy Horse

Alternative
Best Alternative Music Album
Modern Vampires of the City – Vampire Weekend
 The Worse Things Get, The Harder I Fight, The Harder I Fight, The More I Love You – Neko Case
 Trouble Will Find Me – The National
 Hesitation Marks – Nine Inch Nails
 Lonerism – Tame Impala

R&B
Best R&B Performance
 "Something" – Snarky Puppy & Lalah Hathaway
 "Love and War" – Tamar Braxton
 "Best of Me" – Anthony Hamilton
 "Nakamarra" – Hiatus Kaiyote & Q-Tip
 "How Many Drinks?" – Miguel & Kendrick Lamar

Best Traditional R&B Performance
 "Please Come Home"– Gary Clark, Jr.
 "Get It Right" – Fantasia
 "Quiet Fire" – Maysa
 "Hey Laura" – Gregory Porter
 "Yesterday'" – Ryan Shaw

Best R&B Song
 "Pusher Love Girl"
 James Fauntleroy, Jerome Harmon, Timothy Mosley & Justin Timberlake, songwriters (Justin Timberlake)
 "Best of Me"
 Anthony Hamilton & Jairus Mozee, songwriters (Anthony Hamilton)
 "Love and War"
 Tamar Braxton, Darhyl Camper, Jr., LaShawn Daniels & Makeba Riddick, songwriters (Tamar Braxton)
 "Only One"
 PJ Morton, songwriter (PJ Morton & Stevie Wonder)
 "Without Me"
 Fantasia, Missy Elliott, Al Sherrod Lambert, Harmony Samuels & Kyle Stewart, songwriters (Fantasia featuring Kelly Rowland & Missy Elliott)

Best Urban Contemporary Album
Unapologetic – Rihanna
 Love and War – Tamar Braxton
 Side Effects of You –  Fantasia
 One: In the Chamber – Salaam Remi
 New York: A Love Story – Mack Wilds

Best R&B Album
Girl on Fire –  Alicia Keys
 R&B Divas – Faith Evans
 Love in the Future – John Legend
 Better – Chrisette Michele
 Three Kings – TGT

Rap
Best Rap Performance
 "Thrift Shop" – Macklemore & Ryan Lewis featuring Wanz
 "Swimming Pools (Drank)" – Kendrick Lamar
 "Berzerk" – Eminem
 "Started from the Bottom" – Drake
 "Tom Ford" – Jay-Z

Best Rap/Sung Collaboration
 "Holy Grail" – Jay-Z & Justin Timberlake
 "Now or Never" – Kendrick Lamar & Mary J. Blige
 "Power Trip" – J. Cole & Miguel
 "Remember You" – Wiz Khalifa & The Weeknd
 "Part II (On the Run)" – Jay-Z & Beyoncé
Best Rap Song
 "Thrift Shop"
 Ben Haggerty & Ryan Lewis, songwriters (Macklemore & Ryan Lewis featuring Wanz)
 "F**in' Problems"
 Tauheed Epps, Aubrey Graham, Kendrick Lamar, Rakim Mayers & Noah Shebib, songwriters (ASAP Rocky featuring Drake, 2 Chainz & Kendrick Lamar)
 "Holy Grail" 
 Shawn Carter, Terius Nash, J. Harmon, Timothy Mosley, Justin Timberlake & Ernest Wilson, songwriters (Kurt Cobain, Dave Grohl & Krist Novoselic, songwriters) (Jay-Z & Justin Timberlake)
 "New Slaves"
 Christopher Breaux, Ben Bronfman, Mike Dean, Louis Johnson, Malik Jones, Elon Rutberg, Sakiya Sandifer, Che Smith, Kanye West & Cydell Young, songwriters (Anna Adamis & Gabor Presser, songwriters) (Kanye West)
 "Started from the Bottom"
 W. Coleman, Aubrey Graham & Noah Shebib, songwriters (Bruno Sanfilippo, songwriter) (Drake)

Best Rap Album
 The Heist – Macklemore & Ryan Lewis
 Nothing Was the Same – Drake
 good kid, m.A.A.d city – Kendrick Lamar
 Magna Carta... Holy Grail – Jay-Z
 Yeezus – Kanye West

Country
Best Country Solo Performance
 "Wagon Wheel" – Darius Rucker
 "I Drive Your Truck" – Lee Brice
 "I Want Crazy" – Hunter Hayes
 "Mama's Broken Heart" – Miranda Lambert
 "Mine Would Be You" – Blake Shelton

Best Country Duo/Group Performance
 "From This Valley" – The Civil Wars
 "Don't Rush" – Kelly Clarkson & Vince Gill
 "Your Side of the Bed" – Little Big Town
 "Highway Don't Care" – Tim McGraw, Taylor Swift & Keith Urban
 "You Can't Make Old Friends" – Kenny Rogers & Dolly Parton

Best Country Song
 "Merry Go 'Round"
 Shane McAnally, Kacey Musgraves & Josh Osborne, songwriters (Kacey Musgraves)
 "Begin Again"
 Taylor Swift, songwriter (Taylor Swift)
 "I Drive Your Truck"
 Jessi Alexander, Connie Harrington & Jimmy Yeary, songwriters (Lee Brice)
 "Mama's Broken Heart"
 Brandy Clark, Shane McAnally & Kacey Musgraves, songwriters (Miranda Lambert)
 "Mine Would Be You"
 Jessi Alexander, Connie Harrington & Deric Ruttan, songwriters (Blake Shelton)

Best Country Album
Same Trailer Different Park – Kacey Musgraves
Night Train – Jason Aldean
Two Lanes of Freedom – Tim McGraw
Based on a True Story... – Blake Shelton
Red – Taylor Swift

New Age
Best New Age Album
 Love's River – Laura Sullivan
 Lux – Brian Eno
 Illumination – Peter Kater
 Final Call – Kitaro
 Awakening The Fire – R. Carlos Nakai & Will Clipman

Jazz
Best Improvised Jazz Solo
 "Orbits" – Wayne Shorter, soloist
 "Don't Run" – Terence Blanchard, soloist
 "Song for Maura" – Paquito D'Rivera, soloist
 "Song Without Words #4: Duet" – Fred Hersch, soloist
 "Stadium Jazz" – Donny McCaslin, soloist

Best Jazz Vocal Album
 Liquid Spirit – Gregory Porter
 The World According to Andy Bey – Andy Bey
 Attachments – Lorraine Feather
 WomanChild – Cécile McLorin Salvant
 After Blue – Tierney Sutton

Best Jazz Instrumental Album
 Money Jungle: Provocative in Blue – Terri Lyne Carrington
 Guided Tour – The New Gary Burton Quartet
 Life Forum – Gerald Clayton
 Pushing the World Away – Kenny Garrett
 Out Here – Christian McBride Trio

Best Large Jazz Ensemble Album
 Night in Calisia – Randy Brecker, Włodek Pawlik Trio & Kalisz Philharmonic
 Brooklyn Babylon – Darcy James Argue's Secret Society
 Wild Beauty – Brussels Jazz Orchestra featuring Joe Lovano
 March Sublime – Alan Ferber
 Intrada – Dave Slonaker Big Band

Best Latin Jazz Album
 Song for Maura – Paquito D'Rivera and Trio Corrente
 La Noche Más Larga – Buika
 Yo – Roberto Fonseca
 Egg_n – Omar Sosa
 Latin Jazz-Jazz Latin – Wayne Wallace Latin Jazz Quintet

Gospel/Contemporary Christian
Best Gospel/Contemporary Christian Music Performance
 "Break Every Chain" (Live) – Tasha Cobbs
 "Hurricane" – Natalie Grant
 "Lord, I Need You" – Matt Maher
 "If He Did It Before... Same God" (Live) – Tye Tribbett
 "Overcomer" – Mandisa

Best Gospel Song
 "If He Did It Before... Same God" (Live)
 Tye Tribbett, songwriter (Tye Tribbett)
 "Deitrick Haddon" 
 Calvin Frazier & Deitrick Haddon, songwriters (Deitrick Haddon)
 "If I Believe"
 Wirlie Morris, Michael Paran, Charlie Wilson & Mahin Wilson, songwriters (Charlie Wilson)
 "A Little More Jesus"
 Erica Campbell and Tina Campbell & Warryn Campbell, songwriters (Erica Campbell)
 "Still"
 Percy Bady, songwriter (Percy Bady featuring Lowell Pye)

Best Contemporary Christian Music Song
 "Overcomer"
 David Garcia, Ben Glover & Christopher Stevens, songwriters (Mandisa)
 "Hurricane"
 Matt Bronleewe, Natalie Grant & Cindy Morgan, songwriters (Natalie Grant)
 "Love Take Me Over"
 Steven Curtis Chapman, songwriter (Steven Curtis Chapman)
 "Speak Life"
 Toby McKeehan, Jamie Moore & Ryan Stevenson, songwriters (Tobymac)
 "Whom Shall I Fear (God of Angel Armies)"
 Ed Cash, Scott Cash & Chris Tomlin, songwriters (Chris Tomlin)
 "In God's Time" – Tehrah

Best Gospel Album
 Greater Than (Live) – Tye Tribbett
 Grace (Live) – Tasha Cobbs
 Best For Last: 20 Year Celebration Vol. 1 (Live) – Donald Lawrence
 Best Days Yet – Bishop Paul S. Morton
 God Chaser (Live) – William Murphy

Best Contemporary Christian Music Album
 Overcomer – Mandisa
 We Won't Be Shaken – Building 429
 All the People Said Amen (Live) – Matt Maher
 Your Grace Finds Me (Live) – Matt Redman
 Burning Lights – Chris Tomlin

Latin
Best Latin Pop Album
 Vida – Draco Rosa
 Faith, Hope y Amor – Frankie J
 Viajero Frecuente – Ricardo Montaner
 Syntek – Aleks Syntek
 12 Historias – Tommy Torres

Best Latin Rock Urban or Alternative Album
 Treinta Días – La Santa Cecilia
 El Objeto Antes Llamado Disco – Café Tacuba
 Ojo Por Ojo – El Tri
 Chances – Illya Kuryaki and the Valderramas
 Repeat After Me – Los Amigos Invisibles

Best Regional Mexican Music Album (Including Tejano)
 A Mi Manera – Mariachi Divas de Cindy Shea
 El Free – Banda Los Recoditos
 En Peligro De Extinción – Intocable
 Romeo y Su Nieta – Paquita la del Barrio
 13 Celebrando El 13 – Joan Sebastian

Best Tropical Latin Album
 Pacific Mambo Orchestra – Pacific Mambo Orchestra
 3.0 – Marc Anthony
 Como Te Voy A Olvidar – Los Angeles Azules
 Sergio George Presents Salsa Giants – Various Artists
 Corazón Profundo – Carlos Vives

Americana Music
Best American Roots Song
"Love Has Come For You"
Edie Brickell & Steve Martin, songwriters (Steve Martin & Edie Brickell)
"Build Me Up From Bones"
Sarah Jarosz, songwriter (Sarah Jarosz)
"Invisible"
Steve Earle, songwriter (Steve Earle & The Dukes (& Duchesses))
"Keep Your Dirty Lights On"
Tim O'Brien & Darrell Scott, songwriters (Tim O'Brien and Darrell Scott)
"Shrimp Po-Boy, Dressed"
Allen Toussaint, songwriter (Allen Toussaint)

Best Americana Album
Old Yellow Moon — Emmylou Harris & Rodney Crowell
Love Has Come for You — Steve Martin & Edie Brickell
Buddy and Jim — Buddy Miller and Jim Lauderdale 
One True Vine — Mavis Staples
Songbook — Allen Toussaint

Best Bluegrass Album
The Streets of Baltimore — Del McCoury Band
It's Just a Road — The Boxcars
Brothers of the Highway — Dailey & Vincent
This World Oft Can Be — Della Mae
Three Chords and the Truth — James King

Best Blues Album
Get Up! —  Ben Harper With Charlie Musselwhite
Remembering Little Walter — Billy Boy Arnold, Charlie Musselwhite, Mark Hummel, Sugar Ray Norcia & James Harman
Cotton Mouth Man — James Cotton
Seesaw —  Beth Hart with Joe Bonamassa
Down In Louisiana — Bobby Rush

Best Folk Album
My Favorite Picture of You — Guy Clark
Sweetheart of the Sun — The Greencards 
Build Me Up from Bones — Sarah Jarosz
The Ash & Clay — The Milk Carton Kids 
They All Played for Us: Arhoolie Records 50th Anniversary Celebration — Various Artists; Chris Strachwitz, producer

Best Regional Roots Music Album
Dockside Sessions — Terrance Simien & The Zydeco Experience
The Life & Times Of...The Hot 8 Brass Band — Hot 8 Brass Band
Hula Ku'i — Kahulanui 
Le Fou  — Zachary Richard
Apache  & Crown Dance Songs — Joe Tohonnie Jr.

Reggae
Best Reggae Album
 Ziggy Marley In Concert – Ziggy Marley
 Reincarnated – Snoop Lion
 One Love, One Life – Beres Hammond
 The Messiah – Sizzla
 Reggae Connection – Sly & Robbie and the Jam Masters

World Music
Best World Music Album
 Savor Flamenco – Gipsy Kings
 Live: Singing for Peace Around the World – Ladysmith Black Mambazo (tie)
 No Place for My Dream – Femi Kuti
 The Living Room Sessions Part 2 – Ravi Shankar

Children's
Best Children's Album
 Throw a Penny in the Wishing Well – Jennifer Gasoi
 Blue Clouds – Elizabeth Mitchell & You Are My Flower
 The Mighty Sky – Beth Nielsen Chapman
 Recess – Justin Roberts
 Singing Our Way Through: Songs for the World's Bravest Kids – Alastair Moock & Friends

Spoken Word
Best Spoken Word Album (Includes Poetry, Audio Books & Story Telling)
 America Again: Re-becoming The Greatness We Never Weren't – Stephen Colbert
 Carrie and Me – Carol Burnett
 Let's Explore Diabetes with Owls – David Sedaris
 Still Foolin' 'Em – Billy Crystal
 The Storm King – Pete Seeger

Comedy
Best Comedy Album
 Calm Down Gurrl – Kathy Griffin
 I'm Here to Help – Craig Ferguson
 A Little Unprofessional – Ron White
 Live – Tig Notaro
 That's What I'm Talkin' About – Bob Saget

Musical Show
Best Musical Theater Album
 Kinky Boots
Billy Porter & Stark Sands, principal soloists; Sammy James, Jr., Cyndi Lauper, Stephen Oremus & William Wittman, producers; Cyndi Lauper, composer & lyricist (Original Broadway Cast)
 Matilda the Musical
Bertie Carvel, Sophia Gennusa,  Laurence, Bailey Ryon, Miley Shapiro & Lauren Ward, principal soloists; Michael Croiter, Van Dean & Chris Nightingale, producers; Tim Minchin, composer & lyricist (Original Broadway Cast)
 Motown: The Musical
Brandon Victor Dixon & Valisia Lakae, principal soloists; Frank Filipetti & Ethan Popp, producers (Robert Bateman, Al Cleveland, Georgia Dobbins, Lamont Dozier, William Garrett, Marvin Gaye, Berry Gordy, Freddie Gorman, Cornelius Grant, Brian Holland, Ivy Jo Hunter, Michael Lovesmith, Alphonzo Mizell, Freddie Perren, Deke Richards, William Stevenson, Norman Whitfield & Stevie Wonder, composers; Nickolas Ashford, Marvin Gaye, Berry Gordy, Lula Mae Hardaway, Eddie Holland, Michael Lovesmith, Deke Richards, Smokey Robinson, Barrett Strong, Ronald White, Stevie Wonder & Syreeta Wright, lyricists) (Original Broadway Cast)

Music for Visual Media
Best Compilation Soundtrack for Visual Media
Sound City: Real to Reel – Dave Grohl & Various Artists
Django Unchained – Various Artists
The Great Gatsby (Deluxe Edition) – Various Artists
Les Misérables (Deluxe Edition) – Various Artists
Muscle Shoals – Various Artists

Best Score Soundtrack for Visual Media
Skyfall
Thomas Newman, composer
Argo
Alexandre Desplat, composer
The Great Gatsby
Craig Armstrong, composer
Life of Pi
Mychael Danna, composer
Lincoln
John Williams, composer
Zero Dark Thirty
Alexandre Desplat, composer

Best Song Written for Visual Media
 "Skyfall" (from Skyfall)
Adele Adkins & Paul Epworth, songwriters (Adele)
 "Atlas" (from The Hunger Games: Catching Fire)
Guy Berryman, Jonny Buckland, Will Champion & Chris Martin, songwriters (Coldplay)
 "Silver Lining (Crazy 'Bout You)" (from Silver Linings Playbook)
Diane Warren, songwriter (Jessie J)
 "We Both Know" (from Safe Haven)
Colbie Caillat & Gavin DeGraw, songwriters (Colbie Caillat featuring Gavin DeGraw)
 "Young and Beautiful" (from The Great Gatsby)
Lana Del Rey & Rick Nowels, songwriters (Lana Del Rey)
 "You've Got Time" (from Orange Is the New Black)
Regina Spektor, songwriter (Regina Spektor)

Composing/Arranging
Best Instrumental Composition
"Pensamientos For Solo Alto Saxophone And Chamber Orchestra"
Clare Fischer, composer (The Clare Fischer Orchestra)
" Away"
Chuck Owen, composer (Chuck Owen & The Jazz Surge)
"California Pictures For String Quartet"
Gordon Goodwin, composer (Quartet San Francisco)
"Koko On The Boulevard"
Scott Healy, composer (Scott Healy Ensemble)
"String Quartet No. 1: Funky Diversion In Three Parts"
Vince Mendoza, composer (Quartet San Francisco)

Best Instrumental Arrangement
"On Green Dolphin Street"
Gordon Goodwin, arranger (Gordon Goodwin's Big Phat Band)
"Invitation"
Kim Richmond, arranger (The Kim Richmond Concert Jazz Orchestra)
"Side Hikes – A Ridge Away"
Chuck Owen, arranger (Chuck Owen & The Jazz Surge)
"Skylark"
Nan Schwartz, arranger (Amy Dickson)
"Wild Beauty"
Gil Goldstein, arranger (Brussels Jazz Orchestra Featuring Joe Lovano)

Best Instrumental Arrangement Accompanying Vocalist(s)
"Swing Low"
Gil Goldstein, arranger (Bobby McFerrin & Esperanza Spalding)
"La Vida Nos Espera"
Nan Schwartz, arranger (Gian Marco)
"Let's Fall In Love"
Chris Walden, arranger (Calabria Foti Featuring Seth MacFarlane)
"The Moon's A Harsh Mistress"
John Hollenbeck, arranger (John Hollenbeck)
"What A Wonderful World"
Shelly Berg, arranger (Gloria Estefan)

Crafts
Best Recording Package
Long Night Moon
Sarah Dodds & Shauna Dodds, art directors (Reckless Kelly)
Automatic Music Can Be Fun 
Mike Brown, Zac Decamp, Brian Grunert & Annie Stoll, art directors (Geneseo)
Magna Carta... Holy Grail
Brian Roettinger, art director (Jay-Z)
Metallica Through The Never (Music From The Motion Picture)
Bruce Duckworth, Sarah Moffat & David Turner, art directors (Metallica)
The Next Day
Jonathan Barnbrook, art director (David Bowie)

Best Boxed or Special Limited Edition Package
Wings Over America (Deluxe Edition)
Simon Earith & James Musgrave, art directors (Paul McCartney and Wings)
The Brussels Affair
Charles Dooher & Scott Sandler, art directors (The Rolling Stones)
How Do You Do (Limited Edition Box Set)
Mayer Hawthorne, art director (Mayer Hawthorne)
The Road To Red Rocks (Special Edition)
Ross Stirling, art director (Mumford & Sons)
The Smith Tapes
Masaki Koike, art director (Various Artists)

Best Album Notes
 Afro Blue Impressions (Remastered & Expanded)
Neil Tesser, album notes writer (John Coltrane)
 Call It Art 1964–1965
Ben Young, album notes writer (New York Art Quartet)
 Electric Music for the Mind and Body
Alec Palao, album notes writer (Country Joe and the Fish)
 Stravinsky: Le Sacre Du Printemps
Jonathan Cott, album notes writer (Leonard Bernstein & New York Philharmonic)
 360 Sound: The Columbia Records Story
Sean Wilentz, album notes writer (various artists)
 Work Hard, Play Hard, Pray Hard: Hard Time, Good Time & End Time Music, 1923–1936
Nathan Salsburg, album notes writer (various artists)

Historical
Best Historical Album
 Charlie Is My Darling – Ireland 1965 (tie)
Teri Landi, Andrew Loog Oldham & Steve Rosenthal, compilation producers; Bob Ludwig, mastering engineer (The Rolling Stones)
 The Complete Sussex And Columbia Albums (tie)
 Leo Sacks, compilation producer; Joseph M. Palmaccio, Tom Ruff & Mark Wilder, mastering engineers (Bill Withers)
 Call It Art 1964–1965
 Joe Lizzi & Ben Young, compilation producers; Steve Fallone, Joe Lizzi & Ben Young, mastering engineers (New York Art Quartet)
 Pictures Of Sound: One Thousand Years Of Educed Audio: 980–1980 
 Patrick Feaster & Steven  Ledbetter, compilation producers; Michael Graves, mastering engineer (Various Artists)
 Wagner: Der Ring Des Nibelungen (Deluxe Edition) 
 Philip Siney, compilation producer; Ben Turner, mastering engineer (Sir Georg Solti)

Production
Best Engineered Album, Non-Classical
Random Access Memories
Peter Franco, Mick Guzauski, Florian Lagatta & Daniel Lerner, engineers; Bob Ludwig, mastering engineer (Daft Punk)
Annie Up
Chuck Ainlay, engineer; Bob Ludwig, mastering engineer (Pistol Annies)
The Blue Room
Helik Hadar & Leslie Ann Jones, engineers; Bernie Grundman, mastering engineer (Madeleine Peyroux)
The Devil Put Dinosaurs Here
Paul Figueroa & Randy Staub, engineers; Ted Jensen, mastering engineer (Alice in Chains)
...Like Clockwork
Joe Barresi & Mark Rankin, engineers; Gavin Lurssen, mastering engineer (Queens of the Stone Age)
The Moorings
Trina Shoemaker, engineer; Eric Conn, mastering engineer (Andrew Duhon)

Producer of the Year, Non-Classical
Pharrell Williams
 "BBC" (Jay-Z)
 "Blurred Lines" (Robin Thicke featuring T.I. & Pharrell)
 "Happy" (Pharrell Williams)
 "I Can't Describe (The Way I Feel)" (Jennifer Hudson featuring T.I.)
 "Nuclear" (Destiny's Child)
 "Oceans" (Jay-Z featuring Frank Ocean)
 "Reach Out Richard" (Mayer Hawthorne)
 "The Stars Are Ours" (Mayer Hawthorne)
Rob Cavallo
 All That Echoes (Josh Groban) 
 "Bright Lights" (Gary Clark Jr.)
 ¡Dos! (Green Day)
 "If I Loved You" (Delta Rae featuring Lindsey Buckingham)
 "Love They Say" (Tegan and Sara)
 "Things Are Changin'" (Gary Clark Jr.)
 ¡Tré! (Green Day)
 "When My Train Pulls In" (Gary Clark Jr.)
 "You've Got Time" (Regina Spektor)
Dr. Luke
 Bounce It (Juicy J Featuring Wale & Trey Songz)
 "Crazy Kids" (Kesha)
 "Fall Down (will.i.am featuring Miley Cyrus)
 "Give It 2 U" (Robin Thicke featuring Kendrick Lamar)
 "Roar" (Katy Perry)
 "Rock Me" (One Direction)
 "Wrecking Ball" (Miley Cyrus)
 "Play it Again" (Becky G)
Ariel Rechtshaid
 Days Are Gone (Haim)
 "Everything Is Embarrassing" (Sky Ferreira)
 "Lost in My Bedroom" (Sky Ferreira)
 Modern Vampires of the City (Vampire Weekend)
 Reincarnated (Snoop Lion)
 True Romance (Charli XCX)
 "You're No Good" (Major Lazer featuring Santigold, Vybz Kartel, Danielle Haim and Yasmin)
Jeff Tweedy
 The Invisible Way (Low)
 One True Vine (Mavis Staples)
 Wassaic Way (Sarah Lee Guthrie & Johnny Irion)

Best Remixed Recording, Non-Classical
"Summertime Sadness" (Cedric Gervais Remix)
Cedric Gervais, remixer (Lana Del Rey)
"Days Turn Into Nights" (Andy Caldwell Remix)
Andy Caldwell, remixer (Delerium featuring Michael Logen)
"If I Lose Myself" (Alesso Vs. OneRepublic)
Alesso, remixer (OneRepublic)
"Locked Out of Heaven" (Sultan + Ned Shepard Remix)
Sultan & Ned Shepard, remixers (Bruno Mars)
"One Love/People Get Ready" (Photek Remix)
Rupert Parkes, remixer (Bob Marley and the Wailers)

Production, Surround Sound
Best Surround Sound Album
 Live Kisses
Al Schmitt, surround mix engineer; Tommy LiPuma, surround producer (Paul McCartney)
Sailing the Seas of Cheese (Deluxe Edition)
Les Claypool & Jason Mills, surround mix engineers; Stephen Marcussen, surround mastering engineer; Les Claypool & Jeff Fura, surround producers (Primus)
Signature Sound Opus One
Leslie Ann Jones, surround mix engineer; Michael Romanowski, surround mastering engineer; Herbert Waltl, surround producer (various artists)
 Sixteen Sunsets
Jim Anderson, surround mix engineer; Darcy Proper, surround mastering engineer; Jim Anderson & Jane Ira Bloom, surround producers (Jane Ira Bloom)
 Sprung Rhythm
Daniel Shores, surround mix engineer; Daniel Shores, surround mastering engineer; Dan Merceruio, surround producer (Richard Scerbo & Inscape)

Production, Classical
Best Engineered Album, Classical
 Winter Morning Walks
 David Frost, Brian Losch & Tim Martyn, engineers; Tim Martyn, mastering engineer (Dawn Upshaw, Maria Schneider, Australian Chamber Orchestra & Saint Paul Chamber Orchestra)
 Hymn to the Virgin
 Morten Lindberg, engineer (Tone Bianca, Sparre Dahl, & Schola Cantorum)
 La Voie Triomphale
 Morten Lindberg, engineer (Ole Kristian Ruud & Staff Band of the Norwegian Armed Forces)
 Roomful of Teeth
 Mark Donahue & Jesse Lewis, engineers (Brad Wells & Roomful of Teeth)
 Vinci: Artaserse
 Hans-Martin Renz, Wolfgang Rixius & Ulrich Ruscher, engineers (Diego Fasolis, Philippe Jaroussky, Max Emanuel Cenčić, Daniel Behle, Franco Fagioli, Valer Barna-Sabadus, Yuriy Mynenko & Concerto Köln)

Producer of the Year, Classical
 David Frost
Andres: Home Stretch (Timo Andres, Andrew Cyr & Metropolis Ensemble)
Angel Heart, A Music Storybook (Matt Haimovitz & Uccello)
Beethoven: Piano Sonatas, Vol. 2 (Jonathan Biss)
Ben-Haim: Chamber Works (ARC Ensemble)
Celebrating The American Spirit (Judith Clurman & Essential Voices USA)
Elgar: Enigma Variations; Vaughan Williams: The Wasps; Greensleeves (Michael Stern & Kansas City Symphony)
Guilty Pleasures (Renée Fleming, Sebastian Lang-Lessing & Philharmonia Orchestra)
Verdi: Otello (Riccardo Muti, Aleksandrs Antonenko, Krassimira Stoyanova, Carlo Guelfi, Chicago Symphony Chorus & Chicago Symphony Orchestra)
Winter Morning Walks (Dawn Upshaw, Maria Schneider, Australian Chamber Orchestra & St. Paul Chamber Orchestra)
 Manfred Eicher
Beethoven: Diabelli-Variationen (András Schiff)
Canto Oscuro (Anna Gourari)
Pärt: Adam's Lament (Tõnu Kaljuste, Latvian Radio Choir, Vox Clamantis, Sinfonietta Riga, Estonian Philharmonic Chamber Choir & Tallinn Chamber Orchestra)
Tabakova: String Paths (Maxim Rysanov)
 Marina A. Ledin, Victor Ledin
Bizet: Symphony In C; Jeux D'Enfants; Variations Chromatiques (Martin West & San Francisco Ballet Orchestra)
Traveling Sonata – European Music For Flute & Guitar (Viviana Guzmán & Jérémy Jouve)
Voyages (Conrad Tao)
Zia (Del Sol String Quartet)
 James Mallinson
Berlioz: Grande Messe Des Morts (Colin Davis, London Symphony Chorus, London Philharmonic Choir & London Symphony Orchestra)
Bloch: Symphony In C-Sharp Minor & Poems Of The Sea (Dalia Atlas & London Symphony Orchestra)
Fauré: Requiem; Bach: Partita, Chorales & Ciaccona (Nigel Short, Tenebrae & London Symphony Orchestra Chamber Ensemble)
Nielsen: Symphonies Nos. 2 & 3 (Colin Davis & London Symphony Orchestra)
Wagner: Das Rheingold (Valery Gergiev, René Pape, Stephan Rügamer, Nikolai Putilin & Mariinsky Orchestra)
Wagner: Die Walküre (Valery Gergiev, Anja Kampe, Jonas Kaufmann, René Pape, Nina Stemme & Mariinsky Orchestra)
Weber: Der Freischütz (Colin Davis, Christine Brewer, Sally Matthews, Simon O'Neill, London Symphony Chorus & London Symphony Orchestra)
 Jay David Saks
Adams: Nixon in China (John Adams, Russell Braun, Ginger Costa-Jackson, James Maddalena, Janis Kelly, Richard Paul Fink, Robert Brubaker, Kathleen Kim, Metropolitan Opera Chorus and Orchestra)
Adès: The Tempest (Thomas Adès, Audrey Luna, Isabel Leonard, Alan Oke, Simon Keenlyside, Metropolitan Opera Chorus & Orchestra)
The Enchanted Island (William Christie, Joyce DiDonato, David Daniels, Danielle De Niese, Luca Pisaroni, Lisette Oropesa, Plácido Domingo, Metropolitan Opera Orchestra & Chorus)
Handel: Rodelinda (Harry Bicket, Renée Fleming, Andreas Scholl, Joseph Kaiser, Stephanie Blythe, Iestyn Davies, Shenyang & The Metropolitan Opera Orchestra)
Live At Carnegie Hall (James Levine, Evgeny Kissin & The Metropolitan Opera Orchestra)
Verdi: Rigoletto (Michele Mariotti, Željko Lučić, Diana Damrau, Piotr Beczała, Oksana Volkova, Štefan Kocán, The Metropolitan Opera Orchestra & Chorus)

Classical
Best Orchestral Performance
Sibelius: Symphonies Nos. 1 & 4
Osmo Vänskä (conductor), Minnesota Orchestra
Atterberg: Orchestral Works Vol. 1
Neeme Järvi (conductor), Gothenburg Symphony Orchestra
Lutoslawski: Symphony No. 1
Esa-Pekka Salonen (conductor), Los Angeles Philharmonic
Schumann: Symphony No. 2; Overtures Manfred & Genoveva
Claudio Abbado (conductor), Orchestra Mozart
Stravinsky: Le Sacre du Printemps
Simon Rattle (conductor), Berliner Philharmoniker
  
Best Opera Recording
Adès: The Tempest
Thomas Adès (conductor); Simon Keenlyside, Isabel Leonard, Audrey Luna, Alan Oke (soloists); Luisa Bricetti and Victoria Warivonchick (producers)
Britten: The Rape of Lucretia
Oliver Knussen (conductor); Ian Bostridge, Peter Coleman-Wright, Susan Gritton, Angelika Kirchschlager (soloists); John Fraser (producer)
Kleiberg: David and Bathsheba
Tõnu Kaljuste (conductor); Anna Eimarsson and Johannes Weisser (soloists); Morten Lindberg (producer)
Vinci: Artaserse
Diego Fasolis (conductor); Valer Barna-Sabadus, Daniel Behle, Max Emanuel Cenčić, Franco Fagioli, Philippe Jaroussky (soloists); Ulrich Russcher (producer)
Wagner: Der Ring des Nibelungen
Christian Thielemann (conductor); Katarina Dalayman, Albert Dohmen, Stephen Gould, Eric Halfvarson, Linda Watson (soloists); Ohmar Eichinger (producer)

Best Choral Performance
Performers who are not eligible for an award (such as orchestras, soloists or choirs) are mentioned in parentheses
Pärt: Adam's Lament
Tõnu Kaljuste (conductor) (with Tui Hirv & Rainer Vilu; Estonian Philharmonic Chamber Choir; Sinfonietta Riga & Tallinn Chamber Orchestra; Latvian Radio Choir & Vox Clamantis)
Berlioz: Grande Messe de Morts
Colin Davis (conductor) (with Barry Banks, London Symphony Orchestra, London Philharmonic Choir and London Symphony Chorus)
Parry: Works for Chorus & Orchestra
Neeme Järvi (conductor), Adrian Partington (chorus master) (with Amanda Roocroft, BBC National Orchestra of Wales and BBC National Chorus of Wales)
Whitbourn: Annelies
James Jordan (conductor) (with Arianna Zukerman, The Lincoln Trio and the Westminster Williamson Voices)
Palestrina: Volume 3
Harry Christophers (conductor) (with The Sixteen)

Best Chamber Music/Small Ensemble Performance
Roomful of Teeth
Brad Wells & Roomful of Teeth
Beethoven: Violin Sonatas
Leonidas Kavakos & Enrico Pace
Cage: The 10,000 Things
Vicki Ray, William Winant, Aron Kallay & Tom Peters
Duo
Hélène Grimaud & Sol Gabetta
Times Go By Turns
New York Polyphony

Best Classical Instrumental Solo
Corigliano: Conjurer – Concerto for Percussionist & String Orchestra
Evelyn Glennie (soloist), David Alan Miller (conductor)
Bartók, Eötvös & Ligeti
Patricia Kopatchinskaja (soloist), Peter Eötvös (conductor)
The Edge of Light
Gloria Cheng
Lindberg: Piano Concerto No. 2
Yefim Bronfman (soloist), Alan Gilbert (conductor)
Salonen: Violin Concerto; Nyx
Leila Josefowicz (soloist), Esa-Pekka Salonen (conductor)
Schubert: Piano Sonatas D. 845 & D. 960
Maria João Pires

Best Classical Vocal Solo
Winter Morning Walks
Dawn Upshaw
Drama Queens
Joyce DiDonato
Mission
Cecilia Bartoli
Schubert: Winterreise
Christoph Prégardien
Wagner
Jonas Kaufmann

Best Classical Compendium
Hindemith: Violinkonzert; Symphonic; Konzertmusik
Christoph Eschenbach (conductor)
Holmboe: Concerto
Dima Slobodeniouk (conductor), Preben Iwan (producer)
Tabakova: String Paths
Maxim Rysanov (conductor), Manfred Eicher (producer)

Best Classical Contemporary Composition
Winter Morning Walks
Maria Schneider
Piano Concerto No. 2
Magnus Lindberg
Adam's Lament
Arvo Pärt
Violin Concerto
Esa-Pekka Salonen
Partita for 8 Voices
Caroline Shaw

Music Video/Film
Best Music Video

"Suit & Tie" – Justin Timberlake & Jay-Z
David Fincher, video director; Timory King, video producer
"Safe and Sound" – Capital Cities
Grady Hall, video director; Buddy Enright, video producer; Daniel Weisman, video producer; Danny Lockwood, video producer
"Picasso Baby: A Performance Art Film" – Jay-Z
Mark Romanek, video director; Shawn Carter & Aristides McGarry, video producers
"Can't Hold Us" – Macklemore & Ryan Lewis featuring Ray Dalton
Jon Jon Augustavo, Jason Koenig & Ryan Lewis, video directors; Tricia Davis, Honna Kimmerer & Jenny Koenig, video producers
"I'm Shakin'" – Jack White
Dori Oskowitz, video director; Raquel Costello, video producer

Best Music Film
Live Kisses – Paul McCartney
Jonas Åkerlund, video director; Violaine Etienne, Aron Levine & Scott Rodger, video producers
Live 2012 – Coldplay
 Paul Dugdale, video director; Jim Parsons, video producer
¡Cuatro! – Green Day
Tim Wheeler, video director; Tim Lynch, video producer
I'm in I'm out and I'm Gone: The Making of Get Up! – Ben Harper with Charlie Musselwhite
Danny Clinch, video director; Ben Harper, video producer
The Road to Red Rocks – Mumford & Sons
Nicolas Jack Davies & Frederick Scott, video directors; Dan Bowen, video producer

Special Merit Awards

MusiCares Person of the Year
Carole King

Lifetime Achievement Award
The Beatles
Clifton Chenier
The Isley Brothers
Kraftwerk
Kris Kristofferson
Armando Manzanero
Maud Powell

Trustees Award
Rick Hall
Jim Marshall
Ennio Morricone

Technical Grammy Award
 Emile Berliner
 Lexicon

Music Educator Award
 Kent Knappenberger (of Westfield Academy and Central School in Westfield, New York)

Grammy Hall of Fame inductions

In Memoriam 
The following people appeared in the In Memoriam segment:

 Van Cliburn
 George Jones
  Ray Price
  Eydie Gormé
  Annette Funicello
  Richie Havens
  Ray Manzarek
  Alvin Lee
  Dennis Frederiksen
  Andy Johns
  Sid Bernstein
  Al Coury
  Marian McPartland
  Cedar Walton
  Gloria Lynne
  George Duke
  Bebo Valdés
  Chico Hamilton
  Donald Shirley
  Colin Davis
  Stanley Solow
  Bobby Bland
  Morris Holt
  Larry Monroe
  Chris Kelly
  Lord Infamous
  Junior Murvin
  Hugh McCracken
  Ricky Lawson
  Mike Shipley
  Tompall Glaser
  Jack Greene
  Cowboy Jack Clement
  Slim Whitman
  Jody Payne
  Steven Fromholz
  Mindy McCready
  Jim Foglesong
  Sherman Halsey
  JJ Cale
  Peter Rauhofer
  Chi Cheng
  Chet Flippo
  Paul Williams (Crawdaddy! creator)
  Steve Jones
  Marvin Junior
  Bobby Smith
  Deke Richards
  Cordell Mosson
  Bobby Martin
  Jerry Boulding
  George Beverly Shea
  Cleotha Staples
  Patti Webster
  Phil Ramone
  Polly Anthony
  Mel Ilberman
  Jules Kurz
  Donald Engel
  Jonathan Winters
  Tony Sheridan
  Jerry G. Bishop
  Larry Lujack
  Sara Montiel
  Oralia Domínguez
  Juan Carlos Calderón
  Risë Stevens
  János Starker
  Claudio Abbado
  Yusef Lateef
  Donald Byrd
  Roy Campbell, Jr.
  Cory Monteith
  Randy Ostin
  Milt Olin
  Ed Shaughnessy
  Al Porcino
  Norman Winter
  Oscar Castro-Neves
  Jim Hall
  Frank Wess
  Ray Dolby
  Amar Bose
  Mort Nasatir
  Lou Reed
  Alan Myers (drummer)
  Phil Everly

Artists with multiple wins and nominations 

The following artists received multiple nominations:
Nine: Jay-Z
Seven: Kendrick Lamar, Macklemore & Ryan Lewis, Justin Timberlake, Pharrell Williams
Five: Daft Punk, Drake, Bob Ludwig
Four: Lorde, Bruno Mars, Kacey Musgraves, Taylor Swift, 
Three: Jeff Bhasker, Black Sabbath, Tamar Braxton, Fantasia, Peter Franco, Dave Grohl, Mick Guzauski, Florian Lagatta, Daniel Lerner, Manny Marroquin, Charlie Musselwhite, Nile Rodgers, Robin Thicke, Tye Tribbett, Tehrah
Two: Jessi Alexander, Sara Bareilles, Mary J. Blige, David Bowie, Edie Brickell, Rob Caggiano, Gary Clark, Jr., Tasha Cobbs, Coldplay, Ray Dalton, Lana Del Rey, Alexandre Desplat, Dr. Luke, Natalie Grant, Dave Grohl, Anthony Hamilton, Ben Harper, Connie Harrington, Calvin Harris, Imagine Dragons, Sarah Jarosz, Kaskade, Mary Lambert, Led Zeppelin, Ari Levine, Joel Little, Matt Maher, Mandisa, Max Martin, Steve Martin, Shane McAnally, Paul McCartney, Tim McGraw, Miguel, Katy Perry, Pink, Gregory Porter, Queens of the Stone Age, Rihanna, Nate Ruess, Noah Shebib, Ed Sheeran, Blake Shelton, T.I., Timbaland, Chris Tomlin, Allen Toussaint, Wanz, Kanye West, Jack White

The following artists received multiple awards:
Four: Bob Ludwig, Macklemore & Ryan Lewis, Daft Punk, Pharrell Williams
Three: Peter Franco, Mick Guzauski, Florian Lagatta, Daniel Lerner, Nile Rodgers, Justin Timberlake
Two: David Frost, Dave Grohl, Jay-Z, Lorde, Paul McCartney, Kacey Musgraves, Tye Tribbett

Live-GIFs

The 56th Annual Grammy Awards were the first in the show's history to incorporate comprehensive Live-GIF integration through Tumblr. Creative agency Deckhouse Digital was hired to facilitate the integration, producing more than 50 animated GIFs during the live broadcast and publishing them to the official Grammy tumblr page in real time. The images contributed to the more than 5.1 million reblogs and likes that Grammy related posts received on the blogging site, and the record breaking 34 million combined social media interactions related to the live broadcast.

References

External links 
 
 Grammy Nominations Concert Returning to L.A.  September 18, 2013

2014 in American music
Grammy
2014 music awards
2014 in Los Angeles
 056
January 2014 events in the United States